Keekorok Airport  is an airport in Masai Mara, Kenya.

Location
Keekorok Airport is located in Masai Mara, in Narok County, in southwestern Kenya, close to the International border with the Republic of Tanzania, near the location called Keekorok.

The geographical coordinates of this airport are:1° 35' 9.00"S, +35° 15' 6.00"E (Latitude:-1.585832; Longitude:35.251667).

Overview
Keekorok Airport is a small civilian airport, serving Keekorok in Masai Mara and the neighbouring communities.

Airlines and destinations

See also
 Kenya Airports Authority
 Kenya Civil Aviation Authority
 List of airports in Kenya

References

External links
 Location of Keekorok Airport At Google Maps
 Details of Some of Kenya's Airport Runways
 Website of Kenya Airports Authority
 List of Airports In Kenya
 Airkenya Routes
 List of all Airports in Masai Mara

Airports in Kenya
Airports in Rift Valley Province
Narok County